Stannah Lifts Holdings Ltd is a provider of elevators, escalators and moving walkways and manufacturer of stairlifts and platform lifts. The headquarters are in Andover, Hampshire, Great Britain. The company makes various commercial lifts, but it is best known for its stairlifts, with which its name has become synonymous.

The company headquarters, lift distribution and service division and stairlift division are in the Portway Industrial Estate on the western outskirts of Andover. The company also operates a factory in Newburn, near Newcastle-upon-Tyne.

History
Joseph Stannah founded the company in London in 1867. Initially, a manufacturer of cranes and hoists for transporting ships' cargo, the company began to make hand-powered passenger lifts at the turn of the 20th century. Its first headquarters were on Southwark Bridge Road, before moving to Bankside in the early 20th century. The company remained here until the site was destroyed during the London Blitz. Leslie Stannah, the chairman at the time, built new headquarters at Tiverton Street, Southwark using compensation money awarded to the company.

Stannah Lifts moved from London to Andover in 1974, produced its first stairlift in 1975, and began exporting in 1979.  From there, it established itself as the leading manufacturer of stairlifts worldwide, as well as Britain's largest lift manufacturer. Subsidiaries were opened in the United States and The Netherlands in 1992, and Slovakia in 2003. The company also purchased distributors in Ireland in 2005, and Norway in 2010.  The company has produced over 700,000 stairlifts in February 2011 during a visit by the Prince of Wales to the Andover headquarters.

Products

Stairlifts & Homelifts
The company's stairlift division manufactures new stairlifts as well as reconditioning old units. Models are produced for both straight, curved and external staircases, with all units using a rail fitted to the stair tread.

Commercial lifts
Stannah is a UK supplier of lift products supplying passenger and platform lifts, goods and service lifts, and escalators & moving walkways for all types of buildings, alongside providing maintenance and repair services.

Corporate
Since its foundation, the company has remained a family-run business. At present, six fifth-generation members of the family maintain a 100% shareholding in the company. Stannah Lifts was officially incorporated as a Private Limited Company in March 1961. In December 2009, the company reported an annual turnover of £183,426,000 and a profit of £9,671,000.

See also
 List of elevator manufacturers

References

Companies established in 1867
Companies based in Hampshire
Elevator manufacturers
Escalator manufacturers
British brands